Yared Hagos (born 27 March 1983) is a Swedish former professional ice hockey centre of Ethiopian descent, who last played for the Sheffield Steelers in the UK's EIHL. He also recently played with the Krefeld Pinguine in the Deutsche Eishockey Liga (DEL).

Playing career
Hagos started playing professionally in the Swedish elite league in the 2000–01 season with AIK Hockey. He played for AIK for one more season before playing two seasons with Timrå IK. He was drafted by Dallas Stars in the 2001 NHL Entry Draft, as their third pick, 70th overall. Hagos played for the Iowa Stars in the AHL for two seasons, totalling 44 points in 132 regular season games.

For the 2007–08 season he returned to his native Sweden and played with Mora IK, but after team was relegated from play in Elitserien, he signed a one-year contract with the Swedish Champions of 2008, HV71. Halfway through the 2008–09 season, he changed club again, this time to Södertälje SK.

Hagos played only 26 games in his return to AIK in the 2014–15 season, before securing a release to sign for his second German DEL team, Krefeld Pinguine, on 19 January 2015. On 24 April 2015, Hagos was signed to a one-year extension with Pinguine.

In November 2016, Hagos signed for the Sheffield Steelers as the replacement for Tyler Mosienko who had left the team. On June 13, 2017, Hagos officially announced his retirement.

Career statistics

Regular season and playoffs

International

References

External links

1983 births
Ice hockey people from Stockholm
AIK IF players
Dallas Stars draft picks
HV71 players
Black ice hockey players
Iowa Stars players
Kölner Haie players
Krefeld Pinguine players
Living people
Mora IK players
Skellefteå AIK players
Södertälje SK players
Sheffield Steelers players
Swedish ice hockey centres
Swedish expatriate ice hockey players in the United States
Swedish people of Ethiopian descent
Swedish sportspeople of African descent
Sportspeople of Ethiopian descent
Timrå IK players